U.S. Route 2 (US 2) is a part of the United States Numbered Highway System that is split into two segments. Its eastern segment runs from Rouses Point, New York, to Houlton, Maine. In Vermont, US 2 extends  from the New York state line in Alburgh to the New Hampshire state line in Guildhall. West of Vermont, US 2 continues into New York for another  to an intersection with US 11 in Rouses Point. US 2 passes through the cities of Burlington and Montpelier as it traverses the state. The Burlington to Montpelier route was first laid out as a toll road in the early 19th century. It was later incorporated into the transcontinental auto trail known as the Theodore Roosevelt International Highway in 1919 before being designated as part of US 2 in 1926.

Although the portion of the road from Alburgh to Burlington follows a north–south alignment, US 2 is continuously signed east (heading south during this portion) and west (heading north) to match its overall alignment, making it the longest east–west signed route in the state. At a nearly  overall length, US 2 is also the longest highway of any designation (Interstate, U.S. Route, or state highway) that enters the state of Vermont.

Route description

From there, it crosses Lake Champlain into Grand Isle County, traversing the length of the county and crossing Lake Champlain over several bridges until it reaches the mainland in Milton and Chittenden County. From there, it travels south to Burlington, where it begins to closely parallel Interstate 89 (I-89) and the Winooski River all the way to Montpelier and Washington County. In Montpelier, the main route bypasses the downtown area using Memorial Drive, while a business loop using State Street serves downtown. After leaving Montpelier, the road turns northeastward, crossing into Caledonia County and passing through St. Johnsbury. It then passes into rural Essex County and eventually crosses the Connecticut River from Guildhall into Lancaster, New Hampshire.

History
An improved road between the main settlements of Burlington and Montpelier was first established from old footpaths in 1805, when the  Winooski Turnpike was chartered by the state of Vermont. The old turnpike road utilized the relatively flat banks of the Winooski River to connect the two major towns and opened to traffic several years after the company was chartered. The road ceased operating as a toll road several decades later in 1852, when the road became publicly owned. The route of the old Winooski Turnpike between Burlington and Montpelier was later incorporated into the old Theodore Roosevelt International Highway. This cross-country auto trail, named in honor of recently deceased ex-president and naturalist Theodore Roosevelt, was organized in February 1919 to connect Portland, Maine, with Portland, Oregon. Within Vermont, the auto trail used what is now US 2 from Vermont Route 129 (VT 129) south of Alburgh center to VT 18 east of St. Johnsbury center.

Before being designated as US 2, the current alignment was part of several interstate routes of the 1922 New England road marking system. From Danville eastward to the state line, the US 2 alignment was part of Route 15; it was part of Route 18 between Montpelier and Danville; it used Route 14 between Burlington and Montpelier; and it used Route 30 between Alburgh and Burlington. When the plans for the U.S. Highway System were first drawn up in 1925, US 2 began in Alburgh and was routed along the Roosevelt Highway from Alburgh to Montpelier. Both US 2 and the Roosevelt Highway connected Montpelier to St. Johnsbury; however, the Roosevelt Highway used a direct path along former Route 18 while US 2 was initially assigned to then-Route 25 (modern US 302) to Wells River, where it overlapped proposed US 5 north to St. Johnsbury. From St. Johnsbury, the Roosevelt Highway turned southeast toward Portland along modern VT 18 while US 2 continued east along former Route 15 to Bangor. No changes were made to US 2 in the final system plan approved on November 11, 1926. US 2 was relocated onto its modern alignment along the original Roosevelt Highway route between Montpelier and St. Johnsbury in the mid-1930s. The original alignment of US 2 became part of the newly designated US 302.

Initially, Rouses Point, New York, and Alburgh were connected by way of a ferry across the Richelieu River. The ferry ran from the center of Rouses Point to Vermont's Windmill Point, where it connected to VT F-1, an east–west route linking Windmill Point to Alburgh. When US 2 was assigned, it was overlaid on the preexisting VT F-1, following the route and the ferry to the New York state line, where US 2 initially ended. In 1937, a new tolled swing bridge across the Richelieu River opened, carrying an extended US 2 between US 11 in Rouses Point and Alburgh. The swing bridge was replaced with a toll-free permanent bridge on September 22, 1987.

Major intersections
The short continuation of US 2 into New York is included below.

Suffixed routes

Vermont Route 2A

Vermont Route 2A (VT 2A) is a largely  alternate route of US 2 between St. George and Colchester. It begins at VT 116 in St. George and continues north and west through Williston and Essex Junction before ending at US 2 and US 7 in Colchester. Much of the portion of VT 2A that runs through Williston has been expanded from two to four lanes, particularly the stretch between US 2 and I-89, to accommodate the many restaurants, offices, and stores that have been developed there.

Major intersections

Vermont Route 2B

Vermont Route 2B (VT 2B) is an alternate route of US 2 between Danville and St. Johnsbury. The route begins across the street from the intersection of US 2 and Jamieson Road in Danville, first running south, then curving east at Parker Road, which began west of there at US 2 near a local restaurant. The rest of the road runs through rural Caledonia County and crosses a bridge over I-91 with no access, just south of exit 21 before finally terminating at US 2 in St. Johnsbury.

See also
U.S. Route 2 Business (Montpelier, Vermont)
U.S. Route 2 Truck (St. Johnsbury, Vermont)

References

External links

02
 Vermont
Transportation in Grand Isle County, Vermont
Transportation in Chittenden County, Vermont
Burlington, Vermont
Transportation in Washington County, Vermont
Montpelier, Vermont
Transportation in Caledonia County, Vermont
St. Johnsbury, Vermont
Transportation in Essex County, Vermont